Thomas Lennard, 1st Earl of Sussex, 15th Baron Dacre, (13 May 1654 – 30 October 1715) was an English peer. He became Earl of Sussex in 1674 when he married Lady Anne Fitzroy, illegitimate daughter of Charles II and Lady Barbara Palmer. The Baron Dacre title became abeyant in 1715 following his death.

Cricket
Lennard was a supporter of cricket which developed into a major sport during his lifetime. His 1677 accounts include an item which refers to £3 being paid to him when he went to a cricket match being played at "ye Dicker" (sic), which was then a common in the vicinity of Hailsham in East Sussex.

References

Bibliography
 

1654 births
1715 deaths
15
English cricket in the 14th to 17th centuries
Earls of Sussex (Peerage of England)